Henry Harwood Flintoff (3 September 1930 – 5 June 2020, born Harwood Henry Flintoff) was a farm worker and recipient of the George Cross, Britain's highest civilian award for gallantry, after rescuing a farmer from a bull.

Personal life
Flintoff was born on 3 September 1930 in Saltburn-by-the-Sea, the son of Harwood taylor and Ruth Flintoff; he had seven sisters. The family moved from Saltburn to a farm in Farndale because his father's health was damaged by the chemicals he used in the garage he ran. Flintoff attended school in Farndale, and at the age of 12 started working on his father's farm, named Thunderhead Farm. His whole working life was spent on farms, mainly on the Hutton-le-Hole estate. He married Sylvia in 1993 and she predeceased him. He took a great interest in aviation and was air traffic controller for his local flying club.  He died in a nursing home near Scarborough on 5 June 2020 and his ashes were buried in Gillamoor cemetery, the same cemetery where the man he rescued, John Atkinson, was buried in 1973 after dying from a tractor accident.

George Cross
On 23 June 1944 Flintoff, then a farm labourer aged 13, came to the rescue of farmer John Atkinson who was being attacked by a bull. The local vicar reported the incident to the local press, and Flintoff was awarded the Edward Medal, an award for gallantry for those employed in mines or industry. All recipients of the Edward Medal were in 1972 "deemed to be a person who has been awarded not that Medal but the George Cross".

The description of the event in the official citation in The London Gazette states:

Flintoff was an active member of the Victoria Cross and George Cross Association until his death in 2020.

References

1930 births
2020 deaths
Recipients of the Edward Medal
Recipients of the George Cross
People from Saltburn-by-the-Sea
People from Ryedale (district)
Farmworkers